The Delaware Stars were a United States Basketball League franchise in Wilmington, Delaware. They played on the main campus of Wilmington University. They started playing in 2007. After posting an 0–8 record, the Stars folded in mid-season.

See also
 Delaware Destroyers
 First State Fusion
 Wilmington Bombers
 Wilmington Jets
 List of professional sports teams in Delaware

External links
Delaware Stars Official site
USBL League Website
Delaware Stars - Discussion Forum

United States Basketball League teams
Basketball teams in Delaware
2007 establishments in Delaware
Basketball teams established in 2007
Sports in Wilmington, Delaware